Edmond George Petty-Fitzmaurice, 1st Baron Fitzmaurice,  (19 June 184621 June 1935), styled Lord Edmond FitzMaurice from 1863 to 1906, was a British Liberal politician. He served as Under-Secretary of State for Foreign Affairs from 1883 to 1885 and again from 1905 to 1908, when he entered the cabinet as Chancellor of the Duchy of Lancaster under H. H. Asquith. However, illness forced him to resign the following year.

Early life and education
Born at Lansdowne House in London, Fitzmaurice was the second son of Henry Petty-FitzMaurice, 4th Marquess of Lansdowne and his second wife Emily de Flahault, daughter of the French statesman Charles Joseph, comte de Flahaut. His elder brother was the statesman Henry Petty-FitzMaurice, 5th Marquess of Lansdowne. Fitzmaurice was educated at Eton College and Trinity College, Cambridge, where he served as President of the Cambridge Union in 1866. He studied the Classical Tripos and graduated with a first class degree in 1868.

Career

Fitzmaurice was called to the Bar at Lincoln's Inn in 1871, but never practised. In 1868 Fitzmaurice was elected unopposed to Parliament for the family constituency of Calne, a seat he would hold until 1885, and served as Parliamentary Private Secretary to Robert Lowe, Chancellor of the Exchequer and later Home Secretary, from 1872 to 1874, when the Liberals fell from office. He was appointed Commissioner at Constantinople in 1880, overseeing the reorganisation of the European provinces of the Ottoman Empire under the Berlin Treaty of 1878. However, his ambitious plans and ideas for the area were never implemented.

The Liberal party had returned to power in 1880, and in 1883 William Gladstone appointed Fitzmaurice Under-Secretary of State for Foreign Affairs, succeeding Sir Charles Dilke, which he remained until the fall of the Liberal Government in 1885. The Calne constituency he had represented since 1868 was abolished in 1885, and he was instead chosen as the Liberal party candidate for the Glasgow constituency of Blackfriars and Hutchesontown. However, illness forced Fitzmaurice into semi-retirement before the elections. He returned to public life in 1887 but was unsuccessful in his attempts to return to Parliament when he stood for Deptford in the 1892 general election and for Cricklade in the 1895 general election. However, in 1898 he was successfully returned for Cricklade in a by-election, a constituency he would represent until 1906. When the Liberals came to power in late 1905 under Sir Henry Campbell-Bannerman, Fitzmaurice was appointed to his old post of Under-Secretary of State for Foreign Affairs, but to the surprise of many he was overlooked for a Cabinet post. He was in fact offered the position of Foreign Secretary (which for five years prior had been held by his brother Lord Lansdowne) should Sir Edward Grey refuse it (which he did not). Fitzmaurice chose not to stand in the 1906 General Election, and was instead raised to the peerage as Baron Fitzmaurice, of Leigh in the County of Wiltshire. He remained at the Foreign Office after H. H. Asquith became Prime Minister of the United Kingdom in April 1908 and was admitted to the Privy Council the same month. In October 1908 he was appointed Chancellor of the Duchy of Lancaster, with a seat in the Cabinet. However, a recurrence of his earlier illness forced him to resign the following year, marking the end of his political career. Following Asquith's ascension to the premiership, Fitzmaurice was critical of what he saw as "the Liberals' aimless drift in domestic politics," although following his resignation he was (according to one study) "anxious to dispel rumours that his resignation was caused by a rift with Asquith or misgivings over Lloyd George's controversial 'People's Budget.'"

Business and publications
Apart from his participation in national politics, Lord Fitzmaurice serve as  Chairman of Wiltshire County Council from 1896 to 1906. He was also a biographer, and published works on his great-grandfather, the Prime Minister the 2nd Earl of Shelburne and of his earlier ancestor, the economist, scientist and philosopher Sir William Petty (in Life of Sir William Petty 1623 - 1687, published 1895), of the 2nd Earl Granville and of Charles William Ferdinand, Duke of Brunswick, amongst others. He served as a trustee of the National Portrait Gallery.

Published works of Lord Fitzmaurice include:
 1895:  The Life of Sir William Petty, 1623-1687
 1901: Charles William Ferdinand, Duke of Brunswick : An Historical Study, 1735-1806. London : Longmans, Green & Co.
 1905: The life of Granville George Leveson Gower, second earl Granville, K.G., 1815-1891in 2 vols.
 1912: Life of William, earl of Shelburne, afterwards first marquess of Lansdowne (1912) in 2 vols.
 1914: The country dressmaker : a play in three acts.
 1914: Dandy dolls.
 1914: Moonlighter.

Awards and honours
Fitzmaurice was awarded Fellowship of the British Academy (FBA) in 1914. He provided the finance to set up the County School in Bradford-on-Avon which was renamed  Fitzmaurice Grammar School in his honour after his death. Fitzmaurice Primary School is also named in his honour. Dauntsey's School have named a school house in his honour, as he served as a school governor there from 1893.

Personal life 
Lord Fitzmaurice married Caroline FitzGerald in 1889, daughter of William John FitzGerald of Connecticut. Their marriage was annulled in 1894 and they no children. He died in June 1935, two days after his 89th birthday. The title Baron Fitzmaurice became extinct on his death. Fitzmaurice lived at Leigh House in Bradford-on-Avon, now the Leigh Park Hotel. His family's home was at Bowood House, near Chippenham.

References 

1846 births
1935 deaths
Alumni of Trinity College, Cambridge
Fellows of the British Academy
Barons in the Peerage of the United Kingdom
Chancellors of the Duchy of Lancaster
Younger sons of marquesses
Liberal Party (UK) MPs for English constituencies
Members of Wiltshire County Council
People educated at Eton College
UK MPs 1868–1874
UK MPs 1874–1880
UK MPs 1880–1885
UK MPs 1895–1900
UK MPs 1900–1906
UK MPs who were granted peerages
Presidents of the Cambridge Union
Edmond
Members of the Privy Council of the United Kingdom
Members of the Parliament of the United Kingdom for Cricklade
Members of the Parliament of the United Kingdom for Calne
Peers created by Edward VII
Parliamentary Under-Secretaries of State for Foreign Affairs
Members of the Cabinet of the United Kingdom